Rush Lake is a lake located  in Winnebago County and Fond du Lac County, Wisconsin.

Size and Shape
Rush Lake is roughly shaped like an inverted triangle; the lake is widest at its north end. The lake is rather shallow, with an average depth of only .

Location
Only the southern most point is in Fond du Lac County near Wilmoore Heights.

References

Lakes of Wisconsin
Lakes of Winnebago County, Wisconsin
Lakes of Fond du Lac County, Wisconsin